The 1899 Northwestern Purple team represented Northwestern University during the 1899 college football season. In their first year under head coach Charles M. Hollister, the Purple compiled a 7–6 record (2–2 against Western Conference opponents) and finished in third place in the Western Conference.

Schedule

References

Northwestern
Northwestern Wildcats football seasons
Northwestern Purple football